26A may refer to :

26A, the FAA location identifier for Ashland/Lineville Airport
26a, a 2005 book by Diana Evans
Rainy Lake 26A, a First Nations reserve on Rainy Lake in Rainy River District, Ontario
26A Shed code for Newton Heath TMD 1935-1963

See also
26 (disambiguation)
A26 (disambiguation)